Siuijeonseo is a Korean cookbook compiled in the late 19th century. The author is unknown but is assumed to be a lady of the yangban (nobility during the Joseon dynasty) class in Sangju, North Gyeongsang Province. In 1919, as Sim Hwanjin was appointed as the governor of Sangju, he was acquainted with a yangban family there. After borrowing a cookbook from the family, Sim transcribed its entire contents and then gave the newly bound book to his wife's daughter, Hong Jeong, who has kept the book since that time. Siuijeonseo encompasses Korean cuisine in general and categorizes various foods by cooking method. The book mentions 17 different ways of making traditional alcoholic beverages, diverse dried preserved foods, and vegetables, so it is considered a valuable document for researching Korean cuisine. The book also contains the first known mention in print of the term bibimbap.

See also
Domundaejak (도문대작): Korean cuisine critic book authored by Heo Gyun
Eumsik dimibang
Bibimbap
Gimbap
Sikhye
Kimchi

References

External links
  Brief information about Siui jeonseo Yahoo! Korea encyclopedia
  Brief information about Siui jeonseo empas/EncyKorea
  Representation of Korean traditional cuisine referred in Siui jeonseo

Joseon dynasty works
Korean cuisine
Korean cookbooks
Works of unknown authorship